Chennampalli Fort is a medieval fort located in Tuggali mandal, Kurnool district, Andhra Pradesh, India. It is rumoured that gold and other valuables were buried in the fort during the 17th century. Government officials belonging to the Department of Mines & Geology undertook excavations in the fort during 2017–18. Skeletal remains of elephants and horses were found during the excavations.

References

Forts in Andhra Pradesh
Buildings and structures in Kurnool district